The American Press Institute is an educational non-advocacy 501(c)(3) nonprofit organization affiliated with the News Media Alliance (formerly the Newspaper Association of America). The institute's mission is to encourage the advancement of news media; it conducts research, training, convenes leaders and creates tools for journalism. It describes itself as advancing "an innovative and sustainable news industry by helping publishers understand and engage audiences, grow revenue, improve public-service journalism, and succeed at organizational change."

History
The institute, founded in 1946, initially was at the Columbia University Graduate School of Journalism before moving in 1974 to Reston, Virginia It has been described by The Washington Post as the nation's "most venerable press-management and training organization." The institute's discussion leaders have included former Washington Post Executive Editor Ben Bradlee, former New York City Mayor David Dinkins, Washington Post publisher Katharine Graham, and Pulitzer Prize-winner and former Poynter Institute chairman Eugene Patterson.

However, API's fortunes declined in parallel with those of American newspapers, which were once one of the most profitable businesses in the nation. The institute in early 2012 merged with the NAA Foundation of the Newspaper Association of America and shuttered its landmark headquarters. Starting in 2013, API's leadership led its transformation from a training institution to an "applied think tank," producing research, programs, events and tools that facilitate learning in the news industry mostly outside a traditional training model.

As of 2018, some of API's projects include:

The Media Insight Project, a joint research initiative with the Associated Press-NORC Center for Public Affairs Research at the University of Chicago.
Metrics for News, an analytics program and tool to help publishers understand how their audiences interact with their journalism.
Thought Leader Summits, "one-day summits on focused topics of importance in the current journalism landscape."
Programs on growing reader revenue, improving  accountability journalism and succeeding at organizational change.

As of January 2022, the center's incoming executive director and CEO is Michael D. Bolden, an editor at The San Francisco Chronicle and former managing director of the John S. Knight Journalism Fellowships at Stanford. Previously the institute was led by executive director Tom Rosentiel.

References

501(c)(3) organizations
Organizations established in 1946
American journalism organizations